Kim Hyung-Ho  (born 20 February 1987) is a South Korean football player.

He was arrested on the charge connected with the match fixing allegations on 7 July 2011.

References

External links 
 

1987 births
Living people
Association football midfielders
South Korean footballers
K League 1 players
Jeonnam Dragons players
People from Gwangyang